Thalassoduvalius masidai is a species of beetle in the family Carabidae, the only species in the genus Thalassoduvalius.

References

Trechinae